Ascidia is a genus of tunicates in the family Ascidiidae.

Selected species

 Ascidia achimotae Millar, 1953
 Ascidia adamanensis Oka, 1915
 Ascidia ahodori Oka, 1927
 Ascidia alisea Monniot & Monniot, 2006
 Ascidia alpha Tokioka, 1953
 Ascidia alterna Monniot & Monniot, 1991
 Ascidia archaia Sluiter, 1890
 Ascidia arenosa Hartmeyer, 1898
 Ascidia armata Hartmeyer, 1906
 Ascidia aspera Brunetti, 2007
 Ascidia austera Sluiter, 1904
 Ascidia aximensis Millar, 1953
 Ascidia azurea Monniot & Monniot, 1996
 Ascidia bathybia Hartmeyer, 1922
 Ascidia bifissa Sluiter, 1895
 Ascidia bocatorensis Bonnet & Rocha, 2011
 Ascidia caguayensis Millar & Goodbody, 1974
 Ascidia callosa Stimpson, 1852
 Ascidia canaliculata Heller, 1878
 Ascidia cannelata Oken, 1820
 Ascidia capillata Sluiter, 1887
 Ascidia caudata Heller, 1878
 Ascidia celtica C. Monniot, 1969
 Ascidia ceratodes (Huntsman, 1912)
 Ascidia challengeri Herdman, 1882
 Ascidia citrina Nishikawa & Tokioka, 1975
 Ascidia clementea Ritter, 1907
 Ascidia collini Bonnet & Rocha, 2011
 Ascidia columbiana (Huntsman, 1912)
 Ascidia conchilega Muller, 1776
 Ascidia conifera (Hartmeyer, 1911)
 Ascidia corallicola Bonnet & Rocha, 2011
 Ascidia correi C. Monniot, 1970
 Ascidia curvata (Traustedt, 1882)
 Ascidia decepta Kott, 1985
 Ascidia depressiuscula Heller, 1878
 Ascidia despecta Herdman, 1880
 Ascidia dijmphniana Templeton, 1834
 Ascidia dorsata Meenakshi & Renganathan, 1999
 Ascidia empheres Sluiter, 1895
 Ascidia escabanae Monniot, 1998
 Ascidia fictile Monniot, 1997
 Ascidia fistulosa Monniot & Monniot, 1967
 Ascidia formella Monniot, 1998
 Ascidia fusca Monniot & Monniot, 1989
 Ascidia gamma Tokioka, 1954
 Ascidia gemmata Sluiter, 1895
 Ascidia glabra Hartmeyer, 1922
 Ascidia hyalina Oka, 1915
 Ascidia iberica C. Monniot & F. Monniot, 1988
 Ascidia incrassata Heller, 1878
 Ascidia interrupta Heller, 1978
 Ascidia involuta Heller, 1875
 Ascidia irregularis Oka, 1915
 Ascidia kreagra Sluiter, 1895
 Ascidia krechi Michaelsen, 1904
 Ascidia kuneides Sluiter, 1887
 Ascidia lagena Michaelsen, 1922
 Ascidia latesiphonica Hartmeyer, 1922
 Ascidia liberata Sluiter, 1887
 Ascidia limpida Sluiter, 1904
 Ascidia longistriata Hartmeyer, 1906
 Ascidia macropapilla Millar, 1982
 Ascidia malaca (Traustedt, 1883)
 Ascidia matoya Tokioka, 1949
 Ascidia mediterranea Pérès, 1959
 Ascidia melanostoma Sluiter, 1885
 Ascidia mentula Müller, 1776
 Ascidia meridionalis Herdman, 1880
 Ascidia molguloides C. Monniot, 1975
 Ascidia monnioti Bonnet & Rocha, 2011
 Ascidia multitentaculata (Hartmeyer, 1912)
 Ascidia munda Sluiter, 1897
 Ascidia muricata Heller, 1874
 Ascidia nerea Kott, 1985
 Ascidia nordestina Bonnet & Rocha, 2011
 Ascidia nuda Nishikawa, 1986
 Ascidia obliqua Alder, 1863
 Ascidia obocki Sluiter, 1905
 Ascidia occidentalis Kott, 1985
 Ascidia ornata Monniot & Monniot, 2001
 Ascidia pacifica Tokioka, 1967
 Ascidia panamensis Bonnet & Rocha, 2011
 Ascidia papillata Bonnet & Rocha, 2011
 Ascidia papillosa Tokioka, 1967
 Ascidia parasamea Kott, 1985
 Ascidia paratropa (Huntsman, 1912)
 Ascidia perfluxa Sluiter, 1904
 Ascidia placenta Herdman, 1880
 Ascidia polytrema Herdman, 1906
 Ascidia prolata Kott, 1985
 Ascidia prona Monniot & Monniot, 1994
 Ascidia prunum Müller, 1776
 Ascidia pygmaea Michaelsen, 1918
 Ascidia retinens Monniot, 1984
 Ascidia retrosipho Millar, 1988
 Ascidia saccula Kott, 2006
 Ascidia sagamiana Tokioka, 1953
 Ascidia salvatoris (Traustedt, 1885)
 Ascidia samea Oka, 1935
 Ascidia santosi Millar, 1958
 Ascidia savignyi Hartmeyer, 1915
 Ascidia scaevola (Sluiter, 1904)
 Ascidia scalariforme Bonnet & Rocha, 2011
 Ascidia spinosa Sluiter, 1904
 Ascidia stenodes Millar, 1962
 Ascidia stewartensis Millar, 1982
 Ascidia subterranea Kneer et al., 2013
 Ascidia sulca Monniot, 1991
 Ascidia sydneiensis Stimpson, 1855
 Ascidia tapuni Monniot & Monniot, 1987
 Ascidia tenera Herdman, 1880
 Ascidia tenue Monniot, 1983
 Ascidia thompsoni Kott, 1952
 Ascidia translucida Sluiter, 1890
 Ascidia tricuspis Sluiter, 1904
 Ascidia tritonis Herdman, 1883
 Ascidia trunca Brunetti, 2007
 Ascidia unalaskensis (Ritter, 1913)
 Ascidia urnalia Monniot, 1994
 Ascidia vermiformis (Ritter, 1913)
 Ascidia virginea Müller, 1776
 Ascidia willeyi Oka, 1915
 Ascidia xamaycana Millar & Goodbody, 1974
 Ascidia zara Oka, 1935
 Ascidia zyogasima Tokioka, 1962

References

External links

Enterogona
Tunicate genera